The Dragon of the North (literally Frog of the North) is an Estonian fairy tale, collected by Dr. Friedrich Kreutzwald in Eestirahwa Ennemuistesed jutud. Andrew Lang included it in The Yellow Fairy Book; he listed his source as "Der Norlands Drache" from Ehstnische Märchen, which was the German translation of Kreutzwald's work, by F. Löwe.

Synopsis
A dragon came from the north and devastated land. It was said that a man with King Solomon's ring could stop it.  A brave young man set out to find some way. A famous Eastern magician told him that the birds might aid him, and made him a brew that would enable him to understand them; then he said if the man brought him the ring, he would explain the inscription on it.

He heard birds say that only the witch-maiden could help him, and that he could find her at a certain spring when the moon was full. He followed them there. The maiden was offended, but forgave him and took him to her home. The youth heard a voice warn him to give her no blood. She asked him to marry her, and he asked to consider. She offered him King Solomon's ring in return for three drops of blood. She told him its powers. He said, after some days, that he did not quite believe it, and she showed him it, and then let him try it. He escaped with the power of invisibility and flew off.

He went to the magician, who read him the ring, and gave him directions on how to kill the dragon. He went to the kingdom where a king offered his daughter and half his kingdom to anyone who could kill the dragon, and the king got him the iron horse and spear the magician directed. With them, the youth carried the magician's orders, changing the ring from finger to finger as needed, and killed the dragon. He married the princess.

The vengeful witch-maiden pounced on him as an eagle and took back the ring. She chained him in a cave, intending him to die there, but many years later, the magician came to the king and told him he could find him. He followed birds and freed the prince, who was very thin, but the magician nursed him back to health. He went back to his wife and lived in prosperity, but never saw the ring again.

Analysis
Estonian scholar Järv Risto stated that Kreutzwald's tale, "The Dragon (Frog) of the North", is close to Estonian tale type Lohetapja ("Dragon-Slayer"), or ATU 300. According to him, in this Estonian oikotype, the frog sometimes replaces the draconic foe.

See also
The Bird of Truth
Princess and dragon

References

External links
The Dragon of the North

Fictional dragons
Estonian mythology
Estonian fairy tales
Fiction about shapeshifting
Witchcraft in fairy tales
ATU 300-399